The Taman Tun Dr Ismail station, also known as the TTDI station, is a mass rapid transit station on the Kajang Line serving the suburb of Taman Tun Dr Ismail, Kuala Lumpur and Damansara Utama, Petaling Jaya,
Selangor, Malaysia.

The station's location was however the third choice, after two earlier locations received objections during the public display of the line (mandatory under existing laws). The original location of the TTDI MRT Station was next to the TTDI fire station, which was objected and forced Prasarana (project owner pre- establishment of MRT Corp) to propose shifting it next to the TTDI Wet Market, some 300 metres away. This too was not popular, and the majority of objections came from residents of Jalan SS20/10 in Damansara Kim across the LDP. The fear was that parking along the road and area would be congested by future MRT users.

The final location necessitated the acquisition of two Caltex petrol stations on each side of the elevated station. There was also a small plot of land that could have been the site of a multi-storey park and ride (MSPR) building. The MSPR was included in the approved plan, but MRT Corp later sought the approval of the Land Public Transport Authority (SPAD) to remove the MSPR. The odd shape of the small plot available meant that the number of bays were small (less than 120 bays) making the cost per bay too high. The allotted bays were then added to the Phileo Damansara Station MSPR.

It was opened on 16 December 2016 under Phase One operations of the line.

Station features

Station location
The station adopts the standard elevated station design of the MRT Sungai Buloh-Kajang Line with two side platforms located above the concourse level. The station is located directly above Jalan Damansara and its support columns are located along the median of the road.

Station layout

Exits and entrances
The station has two entrances, built on land which were previously petrol stations, and are located on both sides of Jalan Damansara. The feeder bus stops are located at both entrances.

Retail outlet
The station has an outlet of the Japanese chain convenience store FamilyMart, located at the unpaid section of the station concourse level.

Feeder bus services
With the opening of the MRT Sungai Buloh-Kajang Line, feeder buses also began operating linking the station with several residential areas in Taman Tun Dr Ismail, Damansara Utama and Damansara Jaya. The feeder buses operate from the station's feeder bus stops at both entrances of the station.

Gallery

See also
MRT Sungai Buloh-Kajang Line
Taman Tun Dr Ismail
Damansara Utama

References

External links

 Klang Valley Mass Rapid Transit website
 Taman Tun Dr Ismail MRT station | mrt.com.my

Rapid transit stations in Kuala Lumpur
Sungai Buloh-Kajang Line
Railway stations opened in 2016